Deaconess Health System is one of the largest health care networks in the Illinois–Indiana–Kentucky tri-state area. It serves a total of 26 counties and consists of 9 hospitals within Southern Indiana and 2 hospitals in Kentucky.It has been ranked as the 2nd best hospital in Indiana and is rated high performing in 9 adult procedures and conditions.

Foundation 

Deaconess was founded in 1892 by a group of Protestant ministers and laymen in a small house on 604 Mary street, Evansville, Indiana, as a 19-bed hospital. In 1897 the house was moved to back of the lot and a new building was constructed on the corner and opened in 1899. In 1922, a four-story addition was built and further construction in 1948 added new administrative offices and two nursing units. The hospital expansion and transformation continued through the 1960s and 1970s to its present day form.

Hospitals 

Deaconess Midtown Hospital is the flagship hospital located on the original site of the Protestant Deaconess Hospital built in 1899. It is the largest hospital within the health system and is a Level II trauma center. The newer Deaconess Gateway Hospital was built in 2006 to serve the eastern side of Evansville. It is located in the neighboring city of Newburgh. It’s campus has seen rapid expansion and now houses 3 other specialty hospitals: The Women’s Hospital, The Heart Hospital and The Orthopedic and Neuroscience Hospital. Deaconess Cross Pointe provides health care services for emotional, behavioral and addiction-related needs. The health system also include 2 hospitals that are dedicated to provide inpatient rehabilitation namely Encompass Health Deaconess Rehabilitation Hospital in Newburgh and the Encompass Health Deaconess Rehabilitation Hospital-Midtown located in Evansville. The Linda E. White Hospice House is also located in Evansville. Deaconess Hospital in Evansville was rated in the top 10 top preforming in adult procedures and conditions. It was also rated #2 in Indiana by U.S Health News.

Other than hospitals solely owned and run by the Deaconess Health System, it also has joint venture and collaborations with other hospitals in Illinois - Lawrence County Memorial Hospital and Ferrell Hospital and in Kentucky - Baptist Health Deaconess Hospital Madisonville.

References

Hospital networks in the United States
Hospitals in Indiana
Healthcare in Southwestern Indiana
Healthcare in Evansville, Indiana